Calumet may refer to:

Places

United States
Calumet Region, in northern Illinois and Indiana
Calumet River
Calumet Trail, Indiana
Calumet (East Chicago)
Calumet, Colorado
Calumet, Iowa
Calumet, Michigan
Calumet, Minnesota
Calumet, Missouri
Calumet, Ohio
Calumet, Oklahoma
Calumet, Pennsylvania, in Westmoreland County
Calumet, Wisconsin, a town
Calumet City, Illinois
Calumet County, Wisconsin
Calumet Township (disambiguation), several places

Canada
 Calumet, a college at York University
 L'Île-du-Grand-Calumet, municipality in the Pontiac Regional County Municipality, Quebec
 Pointe-Calumet, municipality in the Deux-Montagnes Regional County Municipality, Quebec

Ships
 Calumet (ship, 1884), a steamship; wrecked off Evanston, Illinois in 1889; see Lawrence O. Lawson
 Calumet (ship, 1929), a lake freighter; scrapped in 2008
 Calumet (ship, 1973), a lake freighter

 , several ships of the United States Navy

Educational institutions
Calumet College of St. Joseph, Whiting, Indiana, United States
Calumet College, York University, Toronto, Ontario, Canada
Calumet High School (Chicago), Chicago, Illinois, United States

Other uses
Calumet, a French, colonial-era term for a certain type of Native American ceremonial pipe
Calumet (album), a 1973 album by Lobo
Calumet (train), Amtrak's former commuter rail service between Valparaiso, Indiana and Chicago, Illinois
Calumet Baking Powder Company, an American food company
Calumet Farm, a well-known Thoroughbred horse breeding farm, owned by the founder of the Calumet Baking Powder Company

See also
Calumet station (disambiguation)